Bernhard Walthard (29 May 1897 – 12 May 1992) was a Swiss pathologist and Dean of the Faculty of Medicine of the University of Bern.

In 1922 he earned his doctorate at the University of Zurich with a thesis on liver function tests during pregnancy sub partu, in childbirth and in eclampsia. In 1932, he became lecturer at the University of Bern, in 1940 associate professor, and in 1946 full professor. He was also director of the Institute of Pathology of the same university.

Publications
 Walthard, Bernhard (1981). Die Geschichte des Burgerspitals von Bern in der Zeitspanne von 1942-1974. Bern: 1981
 Walthard, Bernhard (1969). Die Schilddrüse. Westberlin: Springer, 1969
 Walthard, Bernhard (1928). "LXXVIII. Zur Pathogenese des dysidrotischen Sympiomenkomplexes. Über ein unter dem Bilde einer Dysidrosis verlaufendes Epidermophytid". Dermatologische Zeitschrift 1928, Nr.53, p. 692-706

Further reading
 Bernhard Walthard zum 60. Geburtstag am 29. Mai 1957. Festschrift. Basel, 1957

References 

1897 births
1992 deaths
University of Zurich alumni
Academic staff of the University of Bern
Swiss pathologists